Redtown may refer to:
Redtown, Ohio, an unincorporated community in Athens County, Ohio
Redtown, Angelina County, Texas, an unincorporated community in Angelina County, Texas